Cassandra Cybele Raver is an American developmental psychologist currently serving as Provost and Vice Chancellor for Academic Affairs at Vanderbilt University. She previously served as Deputy Provost at New York University and Professor of Applied Psychology in the Steinhardt School of Culture, Education, and Human Development at NYU.

Her work has explored the relationship between self-regulation and school readiness in young children, particularly those growing up in poverty. Raver, the 2012 recipient of the American Psychological Association Award for Distinguished Contributions of Applications of Psychology to Education and Training, was described by the APA as "[o]ne of the most highly respected scholars and investigators in developmental science." She is a member of the National Academy of Education.

Biography 
Raver, a native of New York City, graduated cum laude from Phillips Academy in 1982. Her APA biography states that "[h]er clearest memories from childhood are of home, school, and the city as emotionally supportive and intellectually vibrant places to be." Raver received her B.A. from Radcliffe College of Harvard University in 1986 and attended graduate school at Yale University, where she obtained her Ph.D. in developmental psychology in 1994. In her dissertation supervised by Bonnie Leadbeater, Raver examined interactions between low-income 2-year-olds and their mothers, demonstrating that turn-taking and joint attention predicted self-regulatory behaviors. Raver worked at Cornell University, University of Chicago, and New York University before accepting a position at Vanderbilt in 2021. She is the sister of actress Kim Raver.

Raver is married to Clancy Blair, a developmental psychologist at NYU and the principal investigator at NYU's Neuroscience and Education Lab. She has been the recipient of funding from the MacArthur, Spencer, and William T. Grant Foundations, the National Science Foundation, and the National Institutes of Health, specifically the Eunice Kennedy Shriver National Institute of Child Health & Human Development.

Research 
Raver designed and implemented the Chicago School Readiness Project (CSRP), a federally-funded intervention launched in 2003 to improve social-emotional well-being in low-income children enrolled in Head Start programs in Chicago. As part of the project, Head Start teachers underwent training in supportive classroom management techniques and received weekly coaching from mental health consultants. Raver and her team demonstrated that children in classrooms receiving the supports showed improvements in attention and executive function. In addition, teachers reported fewer behavioral problems in children who received the intervention. Researchers have continued to follow the children enrolled in the project over time, and Raver and her colleagues have demonstrated that the supports had a lasting impact; children in the intervention classrooms went on to attend higher-quality high schools than those in the control condition and continued to perform better academically and on measures of executive function years later. Raver's work on the CSRP was described by journalist Paul Tough in his 2016 book Helping Children Succeed.

In another study, Raver collaborated with Clancy Blair to analyze data collected as part of the Family Life Project, an effort to examine the impact of early life stressors on the development of 1,292 children born in low-income counties in Pennsylvania and North Carolina. Raver and Blair demonstrated that exposure to poverty in the first four years of life was predictive of lower scores on measures of executive function. In an additional joint study on the impact of social-emotional factors on executive function, Raver and Blair determined that the implementation of a social-emotional learning curriculum in kindergarten classrooms led to improvements in executive function as well as lower levels of cortisol in children's saliva samples.

Raver and her colleagues developed the Preschool Self-Regulation Assessment (PSRA), a research tool designed to measure emotional, attentional, and behavioral regulation in 3- and 4-year-old children. The PSRA was used to assess self-regulation in young children who participated in the CSRP. Raver was also part of a team of researchers at NYU who worked in collaboration with the NYC Department of Education's Division of Early Childhood Education (DOE-DECE) as it launched Pre-K for All, a citywide effort to provide free, high-quality early education experiences to all preschoolers in New York City.

Selected articles 

 Raver, C. C. (2002). Emotions matter: Making the case for the role of young children's emotional development for early school readiness. Social Policy Report, 16(3), 1-20. https://doi.org/10.1002/j.2379-3988.2002.tb00041.x
 Raver, C. C. (2004). Placing emotional self‐regulation in sociocultural and socioeconomic contexts. Child Development, 75(2), 346–353. https://doi.org/10.1111/j.1467-8624.2004.00676.x
 Raver, C. C., Blair, C., & Willoughby, M. (2013). Poverty as a predictor of 4-year-olds' executive function: new perspectives on models of differential susceptibility. Developmental Psychology, 49(2), 292–304. https://doi.org/10.1037/a0028343
Raver, C. C., Jones, S. M., Li‐Grining, C., Zhai, F., Bub, K., & Pressler, E. (2011). CSRP's impact on low‐income preschoolers’ preacademic skills: self‐regulation as a mediating mechanism. Child Development, 82(1), 362–378. https://doi.org/10.1111/j.1467-8624.2010.01561.x
Raver, C. C., & Knitzer, J. (2002). Ready to enter: What research tells policymakers about strategies to promote social and emotional school readiness among three-and four-year-old children. National Center for Children in Poverty, Columbia University. https://doi.org/10.7916/D82V2QVX
 Raver, C. C., & Zigler, E. F. (1997). Social competence: An untapped dimension in evaluating Head Start's success. Early Childhood Research Quarterly, 12(4), 363–385. https://doi.org/10.1016/S0885-2006(97)90017-X

References

External links 

 Faculty page at New York University
 
 Chicago School Readiness Project

American women psychologists
American developmental psychologists
New York University faculty
Yale University alumni
Living people
Year of birth missing (living people)
Radcliffe College alumni
American women academics
Vanderbilt University faculty
21st-century American women